The United States Department of Defense acknowledges holding nine Russian detainees in Guantanamo.
However, the actual number of Russian citizens in Guantanamo remains unclear. Several men known to have been held in Guantanamo are missing from the official list.
One citizen of Uzbekistan is listed as a Russian.

A total of 778 detainees have been held in extrajudicial detention in the Guantanamo Bay detention camps, in Cuba since the camps opened on January 11, 2002. The camp population peaked in 2004 at approximately 660. Only nineteen new detainees, all "high-value detainees" have been transferred there since the United States Supreme Court's ruling in Rasul v. Bush.

Russian detainees in Guantanamo

References

Russian
Russia–United States relations